The Stone Breakers was an 1849 painting by the French painter Gustave Courbet. It was a work of realism, depicting two peasants, a young man and an old man, breaking rocks.

The Stone Breakers was first exhibited at the Paris Salon of 1850. As a work of realism the subject matter addressed a scene of everyday life. This painting was intended to show the hard labor that poor citizens experienced. Courbet did not show the figure's faces, they represent the "every man" and are not meant to be specific individuals. At the same time the clothing of the figures implies some degree of individuality, the younger man's pants are too short and the older man's vest is striped.

The painting was destroyed during World War II, along with 154 other pictures, when a transport vehicle moving the pictures to the castle of Königstein, near Dresden, was bombed by Allied forces in February 1945.

References

Paintings by Gustave Courbet
Lost paintings
1849 paintings